The Jule, formerly known as KeyLine Transit, is the operator of mass transit within the City of Dubuque, Iowa. The Jule offers transit bus routes throughout the city, trolley-replica transportation in Downtown Dubuque and the Port of Dubuque, and on-demand paratransit "MiniBus" service citywide.  As of the 2011 rebranding, the transit system and city are now both named after Julien Dubuque.  In FY 2010, the Jule recorded 371,000  rides.

The Jule is a municipal department of the City of Dubuque that began service following the city's takeover of the Interstate Power and Light Company's bus lines in the early 1970s. Today, the Jule is operated by The East Central Intergovernmental Association (ECIA), and is supervised by a director who reports to the Dubuque City Manager, Michael Van Milligen, and acts on policy as given by the Dubuque City Council, on advice of the Dubuque Transit Trustee Board.

Overview
The Jule operates six Daytime bus lines: Gray, Green, Red, Medical Loop, as well as the North and South Shopping Circulators.  The Jule also runs four Nightrider routes on Friday and Saturday nights from 6:00 p.m. to 2:30 a.m. All lines except the Orange run in a general pattern from downtown in the east to Kennedy Mall in the west, and then back downtown. These lines stop at all three major transfer stations: Downtown, Midtown, and the West Side. The Medical Loop runs from downtown and then north and south, stopping at no other transfer stations. The Jule operates Monday through Saturday citywide, with the earliest buses out at 6:15 a.m., and the latest out at 5:55 p.m.

During the summer months, The Jule operates a trolley shuttle between the Downtown Transfer Station (West 9th & Main Streets) and the Port of Dubuque, with stops at the major tourist attractions in the area, including: Diamond Jo Casino, Grand Harbor Resort & Waterpark, Grand River Center, National Mississippi River Museum & Aquarium.

In addition to fixed-route buses, The Jule provides on-demand paratransit service through its "MiniBuses." These shuttles generally transport elderly and handicapped passengers from their homes to medical clinics, and other specific destinations. The service is available by appointment only.
Jule currently has around 100 employees.

In 2018, The Jule's operations center moved to a new $6.2 million facility in Dubuque.

Bus Fleet
In 2011, The Jule updated its 28 bus fleet with new clean diesel buses
4 35' Heavy Duty Gillig low floor for Fixed Route Service 

12 30' Medium Duty Eldorado Aero Elite on International Durastar chassis for Fixed Route Service 

11 24' light duty Glaval Titan II on GMC Savanna Chassis for Paratransit 

1 light duty for Freightliner Sprinter for Paratransit 

2 Trolleys for season fixed route trolley Service

Bus routes

Transfer Stations
JFK Circle Transfer Station: Transfers are available between 4 routes.
Midtown Transfer Station: Transfers are available between 3 routes.
Dubuque Intermodal Transportation Center: Transfers between 5 routes in addition to intercity buses operated by Burlington Trailways and Lamers Bus Lines. See main article for more information: Dubuque Intermodal Transportation Center

Lines
The Jule operates 6 daytime bus lines and 4 weekend Nightrider lines which run throughout Dubuque.  Beginning in January 2014, these existing routes will be abandoned in favor of a new hub and spoke model with express routes between the 3 transfer hubs.
(E): Designates crosstown routes which run east from Kennedy Mall to downtown.
(W): Designates crosstown routes which run west from downtown to Kennedy mall.
(N/S), (E/W): Designates non-crosstown (destination) routes which run from a transfer station to one destination & back.
GRAY LINE:
Downtown (E):
Runs east from Kennedy Mall to downtown via: John F. Kennedy Rd., Kaufmann Ave., Carter Rd., Asbury Rd., University Ave., N. Grandview Ave., W. Locust St., Main St.
Kennedy Mall (W):
Runs west from downtown to Kennedy Mall via: Iowa St., Clarke Dr., N. Grandview Ave., University Ave., Asbury Rd., Carter Rd., Kaufmann Ave., John F. Kennedy Rd.
Point (N/S):
Runs north/south from downtown to the Point & back via: Elm St., Rhomberg Ave. Also runs on E. 16th St., Kerper Blvd. at select times.
GREEN LINE:
32nd Street (N/S):
Runs north/south from downtown to 32nd St. & back via: Jackson St., Central Ave.
Asbury Plaza (N/S):
Runs north/south from Kennedy Mall to Asbury Plaza & back via: Pennsylvania Ave., NW Arterial, Asbury Rd., John F. Kennedy Rd., Hillcrest Rd., Chaney Rd., Pennsylvania Ave. Also runs on Rosemont St., Hillcrest Rd. at select times.
Downtown (E):
Runs east from Kennedy Mall to downtown via: Dodge St., University Ave., Loras Blvd., Main St.
Kennedy Mall (W):
Runs west from downtown to Kennedy Mall via: Iowa St., Loras Blvd., N. Grandview Ave., Dodge St.
Medical Loop:
Greyhound Park (E/W):
Runs east/west from downtown to Dubuque Greyhound Park and Casino & back via: Kerper Blvd., E. 16th St.
Mt. Carmel (N/S):
Runs south from downtown to Mt. Carmel & back via: Iowa St., Bluff St., Dodge St., Rush St., Cleveland Ave., Mt. Loretta Ave., S. Grandview Ave., Hwy. 151/61, Locust St.
RED LINE:
Downtown (E):
Runs east from Kennedy Mall to downtown via: John F. Kennedy Rd., Hillcrest Rd., Chaney Rd., Pennsylvania Ave., University Ave., Hill St.
Kennedy Mall (W):
Runs west from downtown to Kennedy Mall via: Hill St., University Ave., Pennsylvania Ave., Chaney Rd., Hillcrest Rd., John F. Kennedy Rd.
Linwood (N/S):
Runs north/south from downtown to Linwood & back via: White St., E. 22nd St., Windsor Ave., Jackson St.
Wal-Mart (E/W):
Runs east/west from Kennedy Mall to Wal-Mart & back via: John F. Kennedy Rd., Pennsylvania Ave., NW Arterial, Dodge St. Also runs on Radford Rd., Chavanelle Rd. at select times.
TROLLEY (E/W):
Runs east/west from downtown to the Port of Dubuque & back via: Bluff St., E. 3rd St., Bell St., Main St. (Summer months only).

Fixed Route Ridership

The ridership and service statistics shown here are of fixed route services only and do not include demand response. Per capita statistics are based on the Dubuque urbanized area as reported in NTD data. Starting in 2011, 2010 census numbers replace the 2000 census numbers to calculate per capita statistics.

See also
 List of bus transit systems in the United States
 List of intercity bus stops in Iowa

References

External links
The Jule Transit Page
Iowa Office of Public Transit: The Jule profile

Bus transportation in Iowa
Transportation in Dubuque, Iowa